Setcases (literally meaning "Seven Houses", set "seven" and cases "houses") is a municipality and town in the Pyrenean comarca of Ripollès in Girona, Catalonia, Spain, near the French border. The Ter River is born in the mountains just above Setcases. The current mayor is Jaume Busquets i Bartolí.

The name Setcases has been documented back to 965, from records of some donations made by Count Sunifred of Besalú, one of the Catalan counties, in the nearby monastery of Sant Pere de Camprodon.

The church contains a Baroque altarpiece dedicated to Saint Michael, which is the only such example of one in all of the Camprodon Valley.  Unlike many other relics, it was saved from being burned by anarchists and communists during the Spanish Civil War.

Today, Setcases has most of its economic base in year-round tourism, including hiking in the warmer months (e.g. Ulldeter hiking circuit) and skiing during the winter season with a lift at Vallter 2000.

Vallter 2000 is a very big attraction for tourists from all Spain.

The weather is very cold, specially in winter the temperature can get to about -20 Celsius. In summer the temperature can rise to 20-25 degrees Celsius.

References

External links
 Government data pages 

Municipalities in Ripollès
Populated places in Ripollès